Wien Matzleinsdorfer Platz is a commuter rail station in Favoriten, Vienna. The station is served by S-Bahn trains and regional trains that use the trunk line.

The station was opened in 1969 above Matzleinsdorfer Platz. Connections are available to tram and bus services. Vienna's first moving sidewalk was opened here to connect the station to the nearby underground tram station. The station closed temporarily on the 27th March 2021 as part of the extension of the U2 underground line. The renovation works are expected to be completed in April 2022.

Connections

Trams
1: Prater Hauptallee - Stefan-Fadinger Platz
6: Burggasse-Stadthalle - Kaiserebersdorf
18: Burggasse-Stadthalle - Schlachthausgasse 
62: Oper, Karlsplatz - Lainz, Wolkersbergerstraße
WLB: Wien Oper - Baden

City Busses
14A: Neubaugasse - Reumannplatz
N6: Westbahnhof - Enkplatz
N62: Kärntner Ring, Oper - Hermesstraße

References

External links
 

Matzleinsdorfer Platz